Akkrum is a railway station located in Akkrum, Netherlands. The station was opened on 1 September 1868 and is located on the Arnhem–Leeuwarden railway. The services are operated by Nederlandse Spoorwegen.

Train services

Bus services

Bus services at this station are operated by Arriva.

See also
 List of railway stations in Friesland

References

External links
NS website 
Dutch Public Transport journey planner 
Arriva website 
Qbuzz website 

Railway stations in Friesland
Railway stations opened in 1868
Railway stations on the Staatslijn A